The 75th Texas Legislature met from January 14, 1997 to June 2, 1997. All members present during this session were elected in the 1996 general elections. The Republicans won the Texas State Senate chamber for the first time since Reconstruction in the 1996 elections.

Sessions

Regular Session: January 14, 1997 - June 2, 1997

Party summary

Senate

House

Officers

Senate
 Lieutenant Governor: Bob Bullock, Democrat
 President Pro Tempore: Judith Zaffirini, Democrat

House
 Speaker of the House: Pete Laney, Democrat

Members

Senate

House

External links

75th Texas Legislature
1997 in Texas
1997 U.S. legislative sessions